Threose is a four-carbon monosaccharide with molecular formula C4H8O4.  It has a terminal aldehyde group rather than a ketone in its linear chain, and so is considered part of the aldose family of monosaccharides. The threose name can be used to refer to both the D- and L-stereoisomers, and more generally to the racemic mixture (D/L-, equal parts D- and L-) as well as to the more generic threose structure (absolute stereochemistry unspecified). 

The prefix "threo" which derives from threose (and "erythro" from a corresponding diastereomer erythrose) offer a useful way to describe general organic structures with adjacent chiral centers, where "the prefixes... designate the relative configuration of the centers". As is depicted in a Fischer projection of D-threose, the adjacent substituents will have a syn orientation in the isomer referred to as "threo", and are anti in the isomer referred to as "erythro".

See also
Threitol
Threonic acid
 Threose nucleic acid

References

Aldotetroses